Robert Luke Vining Jr. (March 30, 1931 – September 1, 2022) was an American lawyer who served as a United States district judge of the United States District Court for the Northern District of Georgia from 1979 to 2022.

Education and career
Born in Chatsworth, Georgia, Vining was a United States Air Force staff Sergeant from 1951 to 1955. He received a Bachelor of Arts degree from the University of Georgia in 1959 and a Juris Doctor from the University of Georgia School of Law in 1959. He was in private practice in Dalton, Georgia from 1958 to 1969, serving as solicitor general of the Conasauga Judicial Circuit from 1963 to 1968. He was a superior court judge of the Conasauga Judicial Circuit from 1969 to 1979.

Federal judicial service
On June 14, 1979, Vining was nominated by President Jimmy Carter to a new seat on the United States District Court for the Northern District of Georgia created by 92 Stat. 1629. He was confirmed by the United States Senate on July 23, 1979, and received his commission on July 24, 1979. He served as Chief Judge from 1995 to 1996, assuming senior status on March 31, 1996.

Personal life and death
Vining died on September 1, 2022, at the age of 91.

References

Sources
 

1931 births
2022 deaths
20th-century American judges
21st-century American judges
Georgia (U.S. state) Democrats
Georgia (U.S. state) state court judges
Judges of the United States District Court for the Northern District of Georgia
Military personnel from Georgia (U.S. state)
People from Chatsworth, Georgia
People from Dalton, Georgia
Superior court judges in the United States
United States district court judges appointed by Jimmy Carter
University of Georgia alumni
University of Georgia School of Law alumni